|}

The Irish Champion Stakes (Irish: Curadh-Dhuais na hÉireann) is a Group 1 flat horse race in Ireland open to horses aged three years or older. It is run at Leopardstown over a distance of 1 mile and 2 furlongs (2,012 metres), and it is scheduled to take place each year in September.

History
The event was established in 1976, and it was initially held at Leopardstown as the Joe McGrath Memorial Stakes. It was named in memory of Joe McGrath (1887–1966), the founder of the Irish Hospitals' Sweepstake and a successful racehorse owner.

The race was transferred to Phoenix Park and renamed the Phoenix Champion Stakes in 1984. Its present title was introduced in 1991, when the event returned to Leopardstown after the closure of its former venue.

The Irish Champion Stakes became part of the Breeders' Cup Challenge series in 2009. The winner now earns an automatic invitation to compete in the same year's Breeders' Cup Turf.

The Irish Champion Stakes has become a very useful prep race for the remaining major races in the Autumn schedule such as the Prix de l'Arc de Triomphe, Champion Stakes, Breeders Cup, Hong Kong International Festival and major Group 1 races in Japan. The 2016 edition of the race was possibly one of its strongest editions with eight out of 12 participants winning 17 career Group 1's between them prior to the race. The form of the race would later see four of the participants win further Group 1 honours by the end of the 2016 season, producing a first & second in that year's Prix de l'Arc de Triomphe, first and second in the Champion Stakes, the winner of the Queen Elizabeth II Stakes, and first and second in the Breeders' Cup Turf.

Winners of the Irish Champion Stakes have gone on to win the Prix de l'Arc de Triomphe in the same season on five occasions: Carroll House (1989), Suave Dancer (1991), Dylan Thomas (2007), Sea The Stars (2009) and Golden Horn (2015), and a sixth Arc win was achieved when 2016 Irish Champion Stakes runner-up, Found, won the 2016 edition of the Prix de l'Arc de Triomphe.

Winners of the Irish Champion Stakes have gone on to win the Champion Stakes in the same season on six occasions: Triptych (1987), Indian Skimmer (1988), Pilsudski (1997), New Approach (2008), Almanzor (2016) and Magical (2019). The race has produced two further winners of the Champion Stakes with the 1986 third, Triptych, and the 2010 third, Twice Over, subsequently winning the British race that season.

Participants in the Irish Champion Stakes have gone on to win several Breeders' Cup titles in the same season. This includes five winners of the Breeders' Cup Turf, with Irish Champion Stakes winners such as Daylami (1999), Fantastic Light (2001), High Chaparral (2003) achieving a season double, while 2015 Irish Champion Stakes runner-up, Found, and a 2016 participant, Highland Reel, found success in the respective season's edition. In 2006, third placed Ouija Board went on to win that season's edition of the Breeders Cup' Filly & Mares Turf.

Success has been also achieved in Japan where the Irish Champion Stakes winners, Stanerra (1983) and Pilsudski (1997) won the Japan Cup in the same season. Meanwhile, 2011 runner-up, Snow Fairy, gained compensation by winning that year's Queen Elizabeth II Commemorative Cup

Records

Most successful horse (2 wins):
 Dylan Thomas – 2006, 2007
 Magical -  2019, 2020 

Leading jockey (7 wins):
 Michael Kinane – Carroll House (1989), Cezanne (1994), Pilsudski (1997), Giant's Causeway (2000), High Chaparral (2003), Azamour (2004), Sea the Stars (2009)

Leading trainer (11 wins):
 Aidan O'Brien – Giant's Causeway (2000), High Chaparral (2003), Oratorio (2005), Dylan Thomas (2006, 2007), Cape Blanco (2010), So You Think (2011), Magical (2019, 2020), St Mark's Basilica (2021), Luxembourg (2022) 

Leading owner (11 wins): (includes part ownership)
 Sue Magnier / Michael Tabor – Giant's Causeway (2000), High Chaparral (2003), Oratorio (2005), Dylan Thomas (2006, 2007), Cape Blanco (2010), So You Think (2011), Magical (2019, 2020), St Mark's Basilica,Luxembourg (2022)

Winners

See also
 Horse racing in Ireland
 List of Irish flat horse races
 Recurring sporting events established in 1976 – this race is included under its original title, Joe McGrath Memorial Stakes.

References

 Paris-Turf: 
 Racing Post:

 galopp-sieger.de – Irish Champion Stakes.
 horseracingintfed.com – International Federation of Horseracing Authorities – Irish Champion Stakes (2018).
 irishracinggreats.com – Irish Champion Stakes (Group 1).
 pedigreequery.com – Irish Champion Stakes – Leopardstown.

Flat races in Ireland
Open middle distance horse races
Breeders' Cup Challenge series
Leopardstown Racecourse
1976 establishments in Ireland